Jiří Hanzl (born 4 August 1951 in Benešov) is a Czech former handball player who competed for Czechoslovakia in the 1976 Summer Olympics.

In 1976 he was part of the Czechoslovak team which finished seventh in the Olympic tournament. He played all five matches and scored 18 goals.

External links
 Profile

1951 births
Living people
Czechoslovak male handball players
Czech male handball players
Olympic handball players of Czechoslovakia
Handball players at the 1976 Summer Olympics
People from Benešov
Sportspeople from the Central Bohemian Region